Touch Me is the third album by the British progressive rock band The Enid. It was released in 1979.

Track listing
 "Charades I) Humouresque" - (6:17)
 "Charades II) Cortege" - (5:11)
 "Charades III) Elegy (Touch Me)" - (3:17)
 "Charades IV) Gallavant" - (7:14)
 "Albion Fair" - (16:00)

Personnel
The Enid
 Robert John Godfrey - keyboards
 Stephen Stewart - guitars, bass
 Francis Lickerish - guitars
 William Gilmour - keyboards
 Terry "Thunderbags" Pack - bass
 David Storey - drums
 Tony Freer - Cor Anglais, oboe

References

External links
RYM page
Progrock Archives.com

1979 albums
The Enid albums
Pye Records albums